The Tembenchi is a major river of Krasnoyarsk Krai in Siberia, central Russia, joining the Kochechum to the northwest of Tura.

The river runs through the remote, sparsely inhabited Syverma Plateau with a very severe climate; there is no vegetation, except mosses, lichens and herbs. Like all Siberian rivers, it suffers from long periods of frost for six to seven months a year, from late October to May, and large tracts of land remain permanently frozen at depth. The river is fed mainly by snowmelt and its high water lasts from late May through until September. Its lower course is characterised by basalts, draining a narrow and rather deep valley of the northwest of the Central Siberian plateau known as Syverma Plateau. Then the river passes the towns of Burungda and Tembenchi on the way to Tura, where it joins the Kochechum.

References

Rivers of Krasnoyarsk Krai